Orkhon may refer to:

 Orkhon River, Mongolia
 Orkhon Valley, the landscape around that river
 Orkhon Province, an Aimag (province) in Mongolia
 several Sums (districts) in different Mongolian Aimags:
 Orkhon, Bulgan
 Orkhon, Darkhan-Uul
 Orkhon, Selenge 
 Orkhon script, a historic script of Turkic origin
 Orkhon inscriptions, inscriptions of Bilge Kagan, Kül Tiğin, and Tonyukuk in Unicode
 Orhun (name), list of people named the Turkish version of Orkhon
Orkhoe, the Greek word for Uruk, a prominent Sumerian city-state